The Fred Best Classic is a Brisbane Racing Club Group 3 Thoroughbred horse race for horses aged three years old, at set weights, over a distance of 1400 metres, held annually at Eagle Farm Racecourse, Brisbane, Australia during the Queensland Winter Racing Carnival.  Prizemoney is A$250,000.

History

The race is named in honour of former top trainer Fred Best (died 1990), who dominated Brisbane racing for 20 years into the 1970s.

The race has its beginnings from the sponsor, Brisbane's newspaper The Courier-Mail, which sponsored a two-year-old race in 1984. The race was not sponsored again by the newspaper until 1987, when the race was run for three-year-olds. The race has seen many name changes.

Trainer Peter Snowden holds the record with three wins in this race (2008, 2010, 2012).

The race record is held by 2007 winner Gold Edition, who ran the 1,350 metres in 1.17.52.

Name
 1984 - Courier Mail 2YO Stakes
 1986 - Channel Seven 2YO Classic
 1987–2001 - Courier Mail Classic
 2002 - Powerhouse Classic
 2003 – Wyndham Estate Classic
 2004–2005 – Richmond Grove Classic
 2006–2009 – BTC Classic
 2010 onwards – Fred Best Classic

Grade
1996–2002 – Listed race
2003 onwards – Group 3

Venue
1984–2016 - Doomben Racecourse
2017 - Eagle Farm Racecourse
2018 - Doomben Racecourse
2019 - Eagle Farm Racecourse
2020 - Doomben Racecourse

Winners

 2022 - Vilana
 2021 - Apache Chase
 2020 - Dawn Passage
 2019 - Military Zone
 2018 - Perast
 2017 - Niccanova
 2016 - Counterattack
 2015 - Najoom
 2014 - Havana
 2013 - Platinum Kingdom
 2012 - Mental
 2011 - Skilled
 2010 - Stryker
 2009 - Court
 2008 - El Cambio
 2007 - Gold Edition
 2006 - La Montagna
 2005 - Gumnuts
 2004 - Gallieni
 2003 - Proudly Agro
 2002 - Tellson
 2001 - Marlina
 2000 - Cryptavia
 1999 - Mr Innocent
 1998 - Staging
1997 - Crafty Beau
1996 - Proud Player
1995 - Chief De Beers
1994 - Ferragamo
1993 - Affirmed Star
1992 - Social Rule
1991 - Committal
1990 - Jonaron
1989 - Spot The Rock
1988 - race not held
1987 - Mirraben
1986 - Christopher
1985 - race not held
1984 - Bonne Princess

See also
 List of Australian Group races
 Group races

References

Horse races in Australia
Sport in Brisbane